Michigan City Post Office is a historic post office building located at Michigan City, LaPorte County, Indiana.  It was designed by the Office of the Supervising Architect under James Knox Taylor and built in 1909.  It is a one-story, Georgian Revival style brick and limestone building.  It has a hipped roof behind a balustraded parapet and basement.  A rear addition was built in 1926, and expanded in 1963.  It housed a post office until 1973.

It was listed on the National Register of Historic Places in 2000.  It is located in the Franklin Street Commercial Historic District.

See also 
List of United States post offices

References 

Michigan city
Georgian Revival architecture in Indiana
Government buildings completed in 1909
Buildings and structures in LaPorte County, Indiana
National Register of Historic Places in LaPorte County, Indiana
Historic district contributing properties in Indiana